Robert William Lowry (17 November 1912 – 7 December 1963) was a New Zealand printer, publisher, typographer and teacher.

Biography

Lowry was born in Paeroa, New Zealand, on 17 November 1912. He was the eldest child of Janet (Jessie) Craig Forrest and Robert William Lowry, a storekeeper, farmer and carpenter from Ireland. 

He was educated at Auckland Grammar School, where he first became interested in typography, and at Auckland University College (1931–1933). He was conferred a bachelor of arts degree during war service in 1943. While still at university, he undertook several printing enterprises, including the printing of The Phoenix, the journal of the university's literary club. At this time Lowry was an admirer of Francis Meynell, Eric Gill and Stanley Morison, as well as Tschichold.

During World War II he served with the 2NZEF in New Caledonia and printed the Forces newspaper in the Pacific.

After university Lowry set up the Unicorn Press, and later the Pelorus Press.

Further reading

Mentioned in
Lowry has been mentioned in many publications:
 
 
  Poem Addressed to Mr Robert Lowry on the Occasion of the Birth of his Fourth Daughter
 
 
 
 .

References

1912 births
1963 deaths
New Zealand educators
New Zealand publishers (people)
New Zealand typographers and type designers
New Zealand industrial designers
People from Paeroa
People educated at Auckland Grammar School
University of Auckland alumni